The 1931 Kentucky Wildcats football team was an American football team that represented the University of Kentucky as a member of the Southern Conference (SoCon) during the 1931 college football season. In their fifth season under head coach Harry Gamage, the Wildcats compiled an overall record of 5–2–2 record with a mark of 4–2–2 against conference opponents, finished sixth in the SoCon, and outscored opponents by a total of 130 to 48. The team played its home games at McLean Stadium in Lexington, Kentucky.

Schedule

References

Kentucky
Kentucky Wildcats football seasons
Kentucky Wildcats football